Beniamino Poserina (born 6 November 1970) is a retired male decathlete from Italy.

Biography
He competed for his native country at the 1996 Summer Olympics in Atlanta, Georgia. A member of Fiamme Azzurre Roma he set his personal best score (8169 points) in the men's decathlon on 6 October 1996 in Formia. That mark has been national record for 26 years.

National records
 Decathlon: 8169 points ( Formia, 6 October 1996) - Current holder

Achievements

National titles
He has won 8 times the individual national championship.
5 wins in the decathlon (1994, 1995, 1996, 1997, 2002)
3 wins in the heptathlon indoor (1996, 1998, 1999)

See also
 Italian records in athletics
 Italian all-time lists - Decathlon

References

External links
 

1970 births
Living people
Italian decathletes
Athletes (track and field) at the 1996 Summer Olympics
Olympic athletes of Italy
People from Monfalcone
Athletics competitors of Fiamme Azzurre
World Athletics Championships athletes for Italy
Mediterranean Games silver medalists for Italy
Mediterranean Games medalists in athletics
Athletes (track and field) at the 1997 Mediterranean Games
Sportspeople from Friuli-Venezia Giulia